Black Lake is located in Cheboygan and Presque Isle counties in northern lower Michigan, United States. The largest body of water in the Black River watershed, it drains through the Lower Black and Cheboygan rivers into Lake Huron. Black Lake is a summer destination for many families from the suburban Detroit area and from other nearby states as well as residents of the neighboring town of Onaway.

Onaway State Park, at the southeastern end of the lake, offers camping, swimming and fishing. Its buildings, built during the Great Depression by the Civilian Conservation Corps, have been deemed eligible for inclusion in the National Register of Historic Places.

Businesses on or near the lake include the Black River Marina, The Bluffs Restaurant and the 211 Outpost. Since the late 1960s, the United Auto Workers Union has maintained the Walter and May Reuther Family Education Center on the site of a former private estate.

Black Lake is noted for its unusual fishing season. A limited lake sturgeon ice fishing season is permitted in the winter. The fishery is limited to six total fish taken each year, each over 36 inches and taken through the ice with fishing spears. 25 anglers are chosen by lottery each day and given a flag to raise when they have caught a fish. When five flags have been raised the season is closed for the year. Seasons have lasted as little as a few hours.

History
The early history of the area was dominated by lumbering and mining. The remains of a long-abandoned limestone quarry are still visible on the south shore of the lake.
The Black Lake Association, founded in 1920, works to maintain the lake's water quality, to promote and improve its walleye and sturgeon fisheries, to keep its members informed about environmental issues that affect them, their property, and the lake itself, and to maintain a record of the lake's vital statistics.
 During the tornado outbreak of October 17, 2007, Black lake was impacted by an EF1 tornado that lasted 10 minutes on the ground. No deaths were recorded, but a barn and some land was partially ruined in the wake.

See also
List of lakes in Michigan

References

External links
Michigan DNR map of Black Lake

Lakes of Michigan
Bodies of water of Cheboygan County, Michigan
Bodies of water of Presque Isle County, Michigan